Bhargav Bhatt (born 1983) is a mathematician who is the Fernholz Joint Professor at the Institute for Advanced Study and Princeton University and works in arithmetic geometry and commutative algebra.

Early life and education
Bhatt graduated with an B.S. in Applied Mathematics, summa cum laude from Columbia University under the supervision of Shou-Wu Zhang. He received his Ph.D. from Princeton University in 2010 under the supervision of Aise Johan de Jong.

Career
Bhatt was a Postdoctoral Assistant Professor in mathematics at the University of Michigan from 2010 to 2014 (on leave from 2012 to 2014). Bhatt was a member of the Institute for Advanced Study from 2012 to 2014. He then returned to the University of Michigan, serving as an Associate Professor from 2014 to 2015, a Gehring Associate Professor from 2015 to 2018, a Professor from 2018 to 2020, and a Frederick W and Lois B Gehring Professor since 2020. In July 2022, he was appointed as the Fernholz Joint Professor in the School of Mathematics at the Institute for Advanced Study, with a joint appointment at Princeton University.

Research
Bhatt's research focuses on commutative algebra and arithmetic geometry, especially on p-adic cohomology. Bhatt and Peter Scholze have developed a theory of prismatic cohomology, which has been described as progress towards motivic cohomology by unifying singular cohomology, de Rham cohomology, ℓ-adic cohomology, and crystalline cohomology.

Awards
In 2015, Bhatt was awarded a 5-year Packard Fellowship. Bhatt received the 2021 New Horizons in Mathematics Prize. He was elected to become a Fellow of the American Mathematical Society in 2021. Also in 2021 he received the Clay Research Award. In 2022 he was awarded the Nemmers Prize in Mathematics.

Selected publications

References

External links
 Website of Bhargav Bhatt

Columbia School of Engineering and Applied Science alumni
Princeton University alumni
University of Michigan faculty
Institute for Advanced Study faculty
Arithmetic geometers
21st-century American  mathematicians
Fellows of the American Mathematical Society
1983 births
Living people